Live at the Copa may refer to:

 Live at the Copa (Bobby Vinton album), 1966
 Live at the Copa (The Temptations album), 1968